The blue-fronted robin (Cinclidium frontale) is a species of bird in the family Muscicapidae. It is the only species in the monotypic genus Cinclidium. It is found in Bhutan, China, Northeast India, Laos, Thailand, Vietnam, and possibly Nepal. Its natural habitat is temperate forests.

References

blue-fronted robin
Birds of Bhutan
Birds of Northeast India
Birds of Laos
Birds of Yunnan
Fauna of Sikkim
blue-fronted robin
blue-fronted robin
Taxonomy articles created by Polbot